Santa Maria Liberatrice a Monte Testaccio is a 20th-century parochial church and titular church on the Monte Testaccio in Rome, dedicated to Mary, mother of Jesus.

History 

Santa Maria Liberatrice a Monte Testaccio was built in 1908 to serve the new suburb at Monte Testaccio, and put in the care of the Salesian Order and the Oblates of St. Frances of Rome. It took its title and much of its artwork from the old church of Santa Maria Liberatrice in the Forum.

On 5 February 1965, it was made a titular church to be held by a cardinal-deacon.

Cardinal-Protectors
Giuseppe Beltrami (1967–1973); cardinal-priest pro hac vice
Opilio Rossi (1976–1987) 
Antonio María Javierre Ortas (1988–2007); promoted to cardinal-priest pro hac vice in 1999
Giovanni Lajolo (2007–present); promoted to cardinal-priest pro hac vice in 2018

References

External links

Titular churches
Roman Catholic churches completed in 1908
20th-century Roman Catholic church buildings in Italy
Churches of Rome (rione Testaccio)
Romanesque Revival church buildings in Italy
Neo-Byzantine architecture
Salesian churches in Italy